Icon is the fifth studio album by French death metal band Benighted. The album was released in October 29, 2007. The CD was recorded, mixed and mastered at Kohlekeller Studios, Seeheim-Jugenheim, Germany. The artwork was created by Phlegeton.

Track listing

Personnel
Benighted
 Julien Truchan – vocals
 Olivier Gabriel – guitar
 Liem N'Guyen – guitar
 Eric Lombard –  bass
 Kevin Foley – drums

Guest musicians
 Karsten "Jagger" Jäger – vocals on "Human Circles"

Production
 Recorded, mixed and mastered at Kohlekeller Studios, Seeheim-Jugenheim, Germany

References

2007 albums
Benighted albums